Johannes Riemann (31 May 1888 – 30 September 1959) was a German actor and film director.  Riemann was a member of the Nazi Party.

Selected filmography

 The Giant's Fist (1917)
 Five Minutes Too Late (1918)
 The Beggar Countess (1918)
 Your Big Secret (1918)
 Anna Karenina (1919)
 The Commandment of Love (1919)
 Veritas Vincit (1919)
 Irrlicht (1919)
 The Enchanted Princess (1919)
 The Clan (1920)
 Kri-Kri, the Duchess of Tarabac (1920)
 Nobody Knows (1920)
 Sappho (1921)
 The Eternal Struggle (1921)
 The Three Aunts (1921)
 Count Varenne's Lover (1921)
 Trix, the Romance of a Millionairess (1921)
 The Anthem of Love (1922)
 The Circle of Death (1922)
 The Love Story of Cesare Ubaldi (1922)
 William Tell (1923)
 Der Herzog von Aleria (1923)
 Count Cohn (1923)
 The Men of Sybill (1923)
 The Treasure of Gesine Jacobsen (1923)
 The City Without Jews (1924)
 Prater (1924)
 The Morals of the Alley (1925)
 The Elegant Bunch (1925)
 Rags and Silk (1925)
 The Golden Calf (1925)
 The Young Man from the Ragtrade (1926)
 We'll Meet Again in the Heimat (1926)
 Marriage Announcement (1926)
 The Armoured Vault (1926)
 Bigamie (1927)
 Valencia (1927)
 The Woman on the Rack (1928)
 Miss Chauffeur (1928)
 The Wrong Husband (1931)
 Such a Greyhound (1931)
 My Heart Longs for Love (1931)
 Love at First Sight (1932)
 Wrong Number, Miss (1932)
 Maid Happy (1933)
 The Gentleman from Maxim's (1933)
 Grand Duchess Alexandra (1933)
 Police Report (1934)
 All Lies (1938)
 Yvette (1938)
 Renate in the Quartet (1939)
 Her First Experience (1939)
 Marriage in Small Doses (1939)
 Bel Ami (1939)
 Everything for Gloria (1941)
 Friedemann Bach (1941)
 The Little Residence (1942)
 A Man for My Wife (1943)
 Beloved Darling (1943)
 The Song of the Nightingale (1944)
 Two Bavarians in the Harem (1957)

References

Bibliography
 Jung, Uli & Schatzberg, Walter. Beyond Caligari: The Films of Robert Wiene. Berghahn Books, 1999.

External links

Johannes Riemann at Virtual History

1888 births
1959 deaths
German male film actors
German male stage actors
German male silent film actors
Male actors from Berlin
20th-century German male actors
Nazi Party members